Alphonse Puthren is an Indian film director, producer, actor, editor, writer, and ad film maker. He works mainly in the Malayalam Cinema. He made his directional debut with the critically acclaimed Malayalam - Tamil bilingual suspense-thriller Neram (2013). His second film was the sensational blockbuster coming-of-age romantic film Premam (2015). After 7 years, he came back with his new film titled Gold starring Prithviraj Sukumaran and Nayanthara in the lead roles.

Early and personal life

Alphonse Puthren was born in Aluva, Kerala, to Daisy Chacko and Puthren Paul. He attended schools including Mount Tabor School Kalamassery, St. Aloysius High School Paravur and higher secondary from Amrita Vidyalayam. He did his Bachelor of Computer Application (BCA) from MES College Marampally, Aluva and later moved on to Chennai, earning a diploma in film making from S. A. E. College, Chennai.

Alphonse is married to Aleena Mary Anthony since 26 August 2015. She is the daughter of popular film producer Alwyn Anthony, who is the owner of Ananya Films. They have a son Ethan (born 2016) and daughter Aina (born 2018).

Career
After graduating, Alphonse started making short films and music videos. Arkan and Sutrum Vizhi were his earliest works, completed in college. In 2008, he made the short film Cling Cling. His next work was Neram, a short film which featured Vijay Sethupathi playing a pivotal character. Alphonse later made the music video Flavours, the video of which was shot using stop motion technique. His next short film was The Angel, employing actors Vijay Sethupathi and Bobby Simha in lead roles. Puthren directed the Malayalam music video Dhaaham, with music by Rajesh Murugesan. Puthren directed the music video Nenjodu Cherthu from the album Yuvvh, with music by Saachin-Sreejith. The video starring Nivin Pauly and Nazriya Nazim became "hugely popular". His next short film was  Eli - a sexy tale which had Bobby Simha, Nivin Pauly and Rajeev Pillai as part of the cast and was produced by actor/director/singer Vineeth Sreenivasan.

Puthren made his entry into the field of advertising by directing the commercial for Bangs Fried Chicken, a fast food chain.

He made his debut in feature films in 2013 with Neram, the full-length feature film version of his short film. The film is bilingual in Tamil and Malayalam and starred Nivin Pauly, Nazriya Nazim and Bobby Simha in lead roles. He wrote the screenplay and also edited the film. He directed the film Premam in 2015 which starred Nivin Pauly, while also writing the screenplay, editing and acting in a cameo role in the film. The film went on to become a blockbuster at the box office and became one of the highest grossing Malayalam films of all time. In April 2017, Alphonse issued a statement in his social media saying that his third directorial film would be a Tamil language film.

Alphonse Puthren edited the trailers of Thattathin Marayathu (directed by Vineeth Sreenivasan) and Oppam (directed by Priyadarshan) and Marakkar (directed by Priyadarshan). He also edited the "Ding Dong Promo Cut" for the film Super Deluxe.

Filmography

As director

As producer

Short films

References

External links 

 

Malayali people
Film directors from Kochi
Malayalam film directors
Tamil film directors
Living people
1984 births